Han Zuilhof (born 1965) holds the Chair of Organic Chemistry at Wageningen University. His interests focus on surface-bound (bio-)organic chemistry and bionanotechnology. He obtained an MSc in Chemistry and MA in Philosophy from Leiden University (both highest honors). After a PhD in Organic Chemistry (Leiden University, 1994; highest honors), and postdoctoral work at the University of Rochester, NY, and Columbia University, he joined the faculty at Wageningen University. He has been a Professor of Organic Chemistry since 2007. He has written over 340 research papers, and more than 10 patents. He is a Distinguished Adjunct Professor of Chemical Engineering at the King Abdulaziz University in Jeddah, Saudi Arabia, and a Perennial Distinguished Guest Professor of Molecular Science and Medicinal Chemistry at the School of Pharmaceutical Science and Technology (SPST) at Tianjin University, China.
He serves/served on the Editorial Advisory Boards of Langmuir, Advanced Materials Interfaces and Applied Surface Science and was a Senior Editor of Langmuir from 2016-2020.  In 2018, Han Zuilhof was elected as a "Fellow of the Royal Society of Chemistry (RSC) for his outstanding contributions to chemical science, and in 2021 was awarded the Robert Robinson Award in Synthetic Organic Chemistry by the RSC for contributions to click chemistry. He is also the founder (2011) of a spin-off company, Surfix.

Among his recent accomplishments are the discovery of tiara[5]arenes,  the first intrinsically chiral click reaction (no chiral auxiliary or catalyst needed), and the synthesis and structure elucidation of SOF4-based SuFEx-derived polymers.

References

1965 births
Living people
21st-century Dutch chemists
Organic chemists
Academic staff of Wageningen University and Research
Leiden University alumni
People from Teylingen